CAB is a jazz fusion group founded by Bunny Brunel, Dennis Chambers, and Tony MacAlpine. Since their formation in 2000, they have released four studio albums and two live albums. Their second album, CAB 2, received a nomination for Best Contemporary Jazz Album at the 2002 Grammy Awards. Other members who have been a part of CAB include Patrice Rushen, Virgil Donati, David Hirschfelder, and Brian Auger.

When asked about the band's name, Brunel said:

Discography

Studio albums
2000: CAB
2001: CAB 2
2003: CAB 4
2009: Theatre de Marionnettes

Live albums
2002: Live!
2011: Live on Sunset

References

External links
Official website

Jazz fusion ensembles
American instrumental musical groups
CAB (band) members